The Vaughan Vipers were a Junior "A" ice hockey team from Vaughan, Ontario, Canada.  They were a part of the Ontario Junior Hockey League.

History
In 1991, the expansion Royal York Rangers joined the Central Jr. B league, which became the Ontario Provincial league.  In 1996, the team moved to become the Vaughan Vipers. In the first season in 1996-97, the Vipers failed to make the playoffs and were the fourth-worst team. After managing only 7 wins out of a 51-game schedule, the Vipers finished with only 18 points, and the Vipers finished out of playoff contention for the third-consecutive year. The 1999-00 season would bring changes, and the Vipers produced talent with some local players, who were discarded from major junior hockey, especially the Ontario Hockey League. The records from the previous years were identical, but in different categories. Vaughan made the post-season for the first time in their short history, especially defeating the Pickering Panthers in four games and the Markham Waxers in 5 games. The Thornhill Rattlers were no match for the Vipers and lost the series in 4 games. The following seasons, the Vipers began to sink to the bottom of the standings and were fortunate to qualify for the playoffs, only to exit the first round. The Vipers would not advance to another playoff round until 2007.

Vaughan's best season came in 2007-08, when the team boosted a 41-4-4 record, despite finishing 2nd place in the OPJHL's South Conference behind the dominant St. Michael's Buzzers. The Vipers received a bye to the next round of the playoffs, but lost the second round series to the Markham Waxers in four games.

In their final 2011-12 season, the Vipers finished 2nd behind the St. Michael's Buzzers, but would lose a heart-breaking series to the Toronto Lakeshore Patriots in 7 games. Marcus Hinds scored the final goal in Vaughan Vipers history just over 11 minutes into the third period in a 4-2 loss to Toronto at the Al Palladini Community Centre in front of 323 fans.

In March 2012, the Vipers withdrew their membership from the OJHL. The news came as a shock, as the Vipers were potential top team in the OJHL and surprise to head coach/general manager Jason Fortier, who had just came up with some marketing ideas for the team, but owner Al Doria claimed it was too late and went ahead with the buyout option offered by the league.

Season-by-season results

Notable alumni
 Bruce Driver
 Dave Reid
 Trevor Daley
 Matthew Corrente
 Justin Peters
 Terry Doumkos

External links
 Vaughan Vipers

Ontario Provincial Junior A Hockey League teams
Sport in Vaughan